The Motorola 4LTR line refers to series of mobile phones from Motorola which have four-letter names, hence the name "4LTR."

Series

References

Motorola mobile phones